Huang Chen-tai (born 17 October 1948) is a Taiwanese educator and politician. He was vice minister of the Research, Development and Evaluation Commission from 1991 to 1994, before assuming the same position at the Ministry of Education until 1995. Subsequently, he was named president of Feng Chia University, where he served until his 1998 appointment as minister of the National Science Council. Huang stepped down from the position in 2000 and became active in the John Tung Foundation. In 2008, Huang left the FCU faculty and became the president of Soochow University. He was named commissioner of the Chinese Professional Baseball League in 2012 and served until his resignation in 2014.

Career
Huang earned a bachelor's degree in chemistry from National Taiwan University and completed advanced studies at the University of Virginia and Columbia University in the United States. He did postdoctoral work at Princeton University and the University of Chicago. Upon his return to Taiwan, Huang joined the faculty of National Tsing Hua University, where he taught chemistry from 1979 to 1991, while also working for the National Science Council and Ministry of Education. In 1991, Huang became vice minister of the Research, Development and Evaluation Commission, and joined the Ministry of Education in the same capacity in 1994. The next year, Huang was appointed president of Feng Chia University. 

He left FCU to chair the National Science Council. As head of the NSC, Huang advocated for research into aftershocks and mapping of the Chelungpu fault, on which the epicenter of the 1999 Chi-Chi earthquake sat. Near the end of his term in 2000, Huang promised to resolve an investigation into United Microelectronics Corporation, which had built a plant in 1998 without submitting an environmental impact assessment for government approval. Huang also announced plans to expand science-based industrial parks across Taiwan. Upon leaving the NSC, Huang joined the John Tung Foundation, and was a proponent of suicide prevention and mental health initiatives.

Huang was named president of Soochow University, where he remained until 2011. In 2012, he was appointed commissioner of the Chinese Professional Baseball League. As CPBL commissioner, Huang oversaw the sale and renaming of the Sinon Bulls to the EDA Rhinos. During his tenure, Huang also explored ways to expand the league. In July 2014, Huang resigned as CPBL commissioner due to a contract dispute with MP & Silva, the company responsible for arranging television broadcasts of league contests.

References

1948 births
Living people
Politicians of the Republic of China on Taiwan from Tainan
National Taiwan University alumni
University of Virginia alumni
Columbia University alumni
Academic staff of the National Tsing Hua University
Ministers of Science and Technology of the Republic of China
Academic staff of Soochow University (Taiwan)
Presidents of universities and colleges in Taiwan
Academic staff of Feng Chia University
Chinese Professional Baseball League commissioners